Bossiaea concinna  is a species of flowering plant in the pea family Fabaceae and is endemic to the south-west of Western Australia. It is an erect, spiny, more or less glabrous shrub with oblong leaves and bright yellow and red flowers.

Description

Taxonomy and naming
Bossiaea concinna was first described in 1864 by George Bentham in his book Flora Australiensis from specimens collected by James Drummond. The specific epithet (concinna) mean "neat", "pretty" or "elegant".

Distribution and habitat
The species of bossiaea grows in sandy soils above the samphire zone usually within sight of a salt lake. It occurs in scattered populations in the Avon Wheatbelt, Coolgardie, Jarrah Forest] and Mallee biogeographic regions of south-western Western Australia.

Conservation status
Bossiaea concinna is classified as "Priority Three" by the Government of Western Australia Department of Parks and Wildlife meaning that it is poorly known and known from only a few locations but is not under imminent threat.

References

Mirbelioids
concinna
Rosids of Western Australia
Taxa named by George Bentham
Plants described in 1864